Wilfred Marcus Askwith  (24 April 1890 – 16 July 1962) was the 2nd Bishop of Blackburn who was later translated to Gloucester. Born in Hereford and educated at Hereford Cathedral School, Bedford School and Corpus Christi College, Cambridge he was ordained in 1914. His first post was as Curate at St Helens Parish Church. After this he was a Master and Assistant Chaplain at his old school then Rector of Stalbridge. From 1925 to 1932 he was Chaplain to Europeans at Nakuru in Kenya. Returning to England he was Vicar of Sherborne then Rural Dean of Leeds before his elevation to the episcopate. He died on 16 July 1962.

References

1890 births
People educated at Bedford School
Alumni of Corpus Christi College, Cambridge
Bishops of Blackburn
Bishops of Gloucester
Knights Commander of the Order of St Michael and St George
1962 deaths
20th-century Church of England bishops